Jim Chapin (born February 27, 1955) is an American speed skater. He competed at the 1976 Winter Olympics and the 1980 Winter Olympics.

References

1955 births
Living people
American male speed skaters
Olympic speed skaters of the United States
Speed skaters at the 1976 Winter Olympics
Speed skaters at the 1980 Winter Olympics
Sportspeople from St. Louis